Maria Lauber (25 August 1891 – 4 July 1973) was a Swiss writer, who published both in Standard German and in the local dialect of Swiss German (specifically "Frutigtütsch", a form of Highest Alemannic).

Life and work
Born in Frutigen, in the Berner Oberland, Lauber worked as a teacher in Adelboden, Lenk and Kiental before retiring in 1952 for health reasons.

Her early work was mainly natural history written in Standard German, but she later published increasing numbers of stories, autobiographical narratives and poems in the Swiss German dialect of the Frutigtal valley, which runs along the river Kander.

In 1966, she was appointed an honorary citizen of Frutigen by the parish council. She is buried in the Frutigen cemetery, where her grave has been given a place of honour.

Awards and prizes
1951 Schiller Prize (for Chüngold)
1966 Literary Prize of the Canton of Bern
1966 honorary citizen of Frutigen

Selected bibliography
Alpen-Legendchen, 1920
D' Wyberschlacht uf de Langermatte. Ein Schauspiel aus der Zeit der Sage in 3 Akten, 1922
Wa Grossatt nug het gläbt. Skizzen über das Brauchtum der Talschaft Frutigen in ihrer Mundart dargestellt, 1939
Eghi Brügg: Gschichti us em innere Frutigtal, 1942
Hab Sorg derzue. Sagen aus der Talschaft Frutigen nach mündlicher Ueberlieferung, 1940
Chüngold (Erzählung), 1950
Chüngold in der Stadt (Erzählung), 1954
Mis Tal (Gedichte), 1955
Bletter im Luft (Gedichte), 1959
Unter dem gekrönten Adler. Die Talschaft Frutigen, 1961

1891 births
Swiss writers
Swiss women writers
1973 deaths